Uittamo-Skanssi (Finnish; Uittamo-Skansen in Swedish) is a ward of Turku, Finland, also known as Ward 3. The ward is located to the southeast of the city and named after Uittamo and Skanssi, two major districts in the ward.

Uittamo-Skanssi has a population of 24,026 and an annual population increase of 0.10%. 15.01% of the ward's population are under 15 years old, while 20.26% are over 65. The ward's linguistic makeup is 90.87% Finnish, 6.36% Swedish, and 2.77% other.

Districts
The ward consists of 12 districts. One district is divided between Uittamo-Skanssi and another ward.

Notes
 The district of Pihlajaniemi is divided between City Centre and Uittamo-Skanssi.

See also 
Districts of Turku
Wards of Turku

Wards of Turku